The Brotherhood of Eternal Love was an organization of drug users and distributors that operated from the mid-1960s through the late 1970s in Orange County, California. They were dubbed the Hippie Mafia by the police. They produced and distributed drugs in hopes of starting a "psychedelic revolution" in the United States.

History 
Appearing in 1968 as an orange tablet measuring about 6 mm across, "Orange Sunshine" acid was the first largely available form of LSD after its possession was made illegal.

The organization was started by John Griggs as a commune, but by 1969, had turned to the manufacture of LSD and the importing of hashish.

In 1970 The Brotherhood of Eternal Love hired the radical left organization Weather Underground for a fee of $25,000 to help Timothy Leary make his way to Algeria after he escaped from prison, while serving a ten-year sentence for possession of marijuana.

Their activities came to an end on August 5, 1972, when a drug raid was executed on the group where dozens of group members in California, Oregon and Maui were arrested. Some who had escaped the raid continued underground or fled abroad. More members were arrested in 1994 and 1996, and the last of them in 2009; Brenice Lee Smith served two months in jail before pleading guilty to a single charge of smuggling hashish, and then was released after being sentenced to time served.

Film 
 Rainbow Bridge, 1971 film
 
 The Sunshine Makers, 2015 film

Books 
 
 
 
First released in 1984. "wider perspective on the history of LSD, ...extending the Brotherhood's story past the point where Schou stops it. Tendler and May also claim a closer relationship between the group and the Mellon heir Billy Hitchcock and the international smuggler (and suspected government provocateur) Ronald Stark "
 
" Schou keeps closer to the original Orange County gang, telling the story largely from their perspective."

See also
 Owsley Stanley
 Tim Scully
 Nicholas Sand
 History of lysergic acid diethylamide
 Urban legends about LSD
 LSD art
 Psychedelic therapy
 Counterculture of the 1960s
 Casey William Hardison
 William Leonard Pickard
 Psychonautics

References

External links
 Orange Sunshine Timeline – OSEL
 Laguna Beach
 Dion Wright - News

Drug rings
1960s establishments in California
1970s disestablishments in California
Organizations based in California
Drug cartels in the United States
Cannabis trafficking
Cannabis in California